Edit Mató (4 February 1947 – 22 February 2020) was a Hungarian ice dancer. With Károly Csanádi, she was the 1966 Winter Universiade champion and a four-time Hungarian national champion. The duo competed at three World Championships and five European Championships. They placed within the European top ten in 1966 (Bratislava, Czechoslovakia), 1967 (Ljubljana, Yugoslavia), and 1968 (Västerås, Sweden).

Mató was the mother of Hungarian speed skater Krisztina Egyed.

Competitive highlights 
With Csanádi

References 

1947 births
2020 deaths
Hungarian female ice dancers
Universiade medalists in figure skating
Universiade gold medalists for Hungary
Competitors at the 1966 Winter Universiade